The Seine–Oise–Marne or SOM culture is the name given by archaeologists to the final culture of the Neolithic  and first culture of the  Chalcolithic in northern France and southern Belgium.

It lasted from around 3100 to 2000 BCE and is most famous for its gallery grave megalithic tombs, which incorporate a port-hole slab separating the entrance from the main burial chamber. In the chalk valley of the River Marne, rock-cut tombs were dug to a similar design. Some have examples of megalithic art with images of axes, breasts, and necklaces carved on their walls.

Diagnostic artefacts include transverse arrowheads, antler sleeves and crude, flat-based cylindrical and bucket-shaped pottery decorated with appliqué cordons. The SOM culture had trade links with neighbouring cultures enabling the use of Callaïs and Grand Pressingy flint imported from Brittany and the Loire and later, the use of copper.

The culture seems to have had strong links with other areas and may have arisen from a composite of influences as indicated by the gallery grave design common across Europe and the pottery types which have comparators in Western France from 2600BC and also in Brittany, Switzerland and Denmark.

Gallery

See also 
 Prehistoric France
 Chasséen culture
 Horgen culture

Notes 

Archaeological cultures of Western Europe
Neolithic cultures of Europe
Chalcolithic cultures of Europe
Archaeological cultures in Belgium
Archaeological cultures in France
Beaker culture